"Love 2000" is Namie Amuro's 15th single on the Avex Trax label. First pressing privileges came with a bonus remix of the title track. The same remix was later included on a vinyl single released two months after the CD version, as their fourth and final single Genius 2000, Released in Japan on New Year's Day, the single debuted at #4 becoming her 15th consecutive top 10 solo single. The single was certified platinum for 400,000 copies shipped.

Commercial tie-in
"Love 2000" was used in Kose cosmetics commercials for the Visee line.

Track listing
Limited edition CD single
 "Love 2000 (Straight Run)" (Tetsuya Komuro, Sheila E., Lynn Mabry, Takahiro Maeda) – 5:15
 "Love 2000 (System Breakdown Mix)" (Remixed by Mike Butler) – 7:47
 "Asking Why" (Nico, Tetsuya Komuro) – 5:10
 "Love 2000 (Instrumental)" (Tetsuya Komuro, Sheila E., Lynn Mabry) – 5:14
 "Asking Why" (Tetsuya Komuro) – 5:07

Regular CD single
 "Love 2000 (Straight Run)" (Tetsuya Komuro, Sheila E., Lynn Mabry, Takahiro Maeda) – 5:15
 "Asking Why" (Nico, Tetsuya Komuro) – 5:10
 "Love 2000 (Instrumental)" (Tetsuya Komuro, Sheila E., Lynn Mabry) – 5:14
 "Asking Why" (Tetsuya Komuro) – 5:07

Vinyl single
Side A
 "Love 2000 (Straight Run)" (Tetsuya Komuro, Sheila E., Lynn Mabry, Takahiro Maeda) – 5:15

 Side B
 "Love 2000 (System Breakdown Mix)" (Remixed by Mike Butler) – 7:47
 "Love 2000 (Instrumental)" (Tetsuya Komuro, Sheila E., Lynn Mabry) – 5:14

Personnel
 Namie Amuro – vocals
 Sheila E. – background vocals, percussion, drums
 Lynn Mabry – background vocals
 Will Wheaton, Jr. – background vocals
 Terry Bradford – background vocals
 Mazayne Lewis – background vocals
 Alex Brown – background vocals
 Renato Neto – keyboards
 Kazuhiro Matsuo – guitar
 Chiharu Mikuzuki – bass guitar

Production
 Producer – Tetsuya Komuro
 Arranger – Tetsuya Komuro, Sheila E., Lynn Mabry, Cozy Kubo
 Mixing – Mike Butler
 Remixing – Mike Butler
 Synthesizer programming – Akihisa Murakami, Toshihide Iwasa
 Art direction and design – Tycoon Graphics
 Photography – Itaru Hirama
 Styling – Sonya S. Park
 Hair and make-up – Akemi Nakano

Charts
Oricon Sales Chart (Japan)

TV performances
 December 24, 1999 – Music Station
 January 1, 2000 – Music Station
 January 14, 2000 – Music Station
 January 31, 2000 – Hey! Hey! Hey! Music Champ
 February 4, 2000 – Music Station
 March 31, 2000 – Music Station
 April 3, 2000 – Hey! Hey! Hey! Music Champ Awards (performed "Asking Why")
 July 28, 2002 – Music Fest Peace of Ryukyu
 September 29, 2002 – ASIA 2002 Music Festival

References

External links
 Songwriter, Takahiro Maeda's thoughts on "Love 2000"

2000 singles
Namie Amuro songs
Songs written by Tetsuya Komuro
2000 songs
Avex Trax singles